Eupithecia oroba  is a moth in the family Geometridae first described by Herbert Druce in 1893. It is found in Mexico and Panama.

The forewings and hindwings are pale fawn colour, each crossed by fine indistinct waved brown lines.

References

Moths described in 1893
oroba
Moths of North America